Chhai Pokhar (or Chah Pokhar/ Chhah Pokhar) is a village in the district of Agra in the Indian state of Uttar Pradesh. It is nearby Achhnera or Achnera, connected by road on three sides of the village and by rail. Khera Sandhan is the nearest railway station at about 1 km from the village on Agra- Achnera-Mathura section of NW Railway. It is also known as Three Towers' Village.

Geography
It has an average elevation of 168 metres (551 feet).
This is a village with exemplary communal harmony it is known as Indolias' village. It has its cultural values. People of Hindu community form majority here while there are few Muslim households, who live together with communal harmony. Chhai Pokhar comes under Tehsil Kiraoli. It is reachable through link roads Agra-Jaipur, Mathura-Bharatpur and Agra-Delhi Highway. The village is connected by rail as well. It is connected to Agra, Jaipur, Kanpur (via Achnera) and Mathura by a train track. River Yamuna locally pronounced as Jamuna, takes a course at about 15  km from here.

Trains available at Khera Sandhan station -

No.	Name	                Type	From	Sch ↑↑	To	Sch	 Departure Days
55342	Bharatpur - Kasganj ...	Pass	 KHSN	07:07	KSJ	11:05	  Daily	
55337	Kasganj Achhnera Fas...	Pass     KHSN	08:37	AH	09:00	  Daily		
55338	Achhnera Kasganj Fas...	Pass	 KHSN	10:49	KSJ	14:40	  Daily		
55333	Kasganj - Agra Fort ...	Pass	 KHSN	11:07	AF	12:30	  Daily		
55334	Agra Fort KasGanj Pa...	Pass	 KHSN	16:44	KSJ	20:35	  Daily		
55341	Kasganj - Bharatpur ...	Pass	 KHSN	21:27	BTE	23:00     Daily

Climate
The temperature in Chhai Pokhar is as in Northern India. Chilled cold nights in winter and hot waves in summer. The temperature in winter goes down to 0 degree Celsius to 2 degree Celsius and dense fog can be witnessed in the months of December and January. The temperature in summer as up as to 45 to 48 degree Celsius.  Rain is generally good. Due to diverse climatic conditions, various types of crops are grown here. National bird peacock or Blue Peafowl (Pavo cristatus) can be seen here on the rooftops in the village and the fields. Nilgai (Boselaphus tragocamelus) is the wild animal which can be seen wandering in the fields. People here respect the wildlife and do not harm them.

Demographics
The population of the village is 2866 according to census of India 2011. Male Population is 1523 whereas there is only 1343 female. (Sex ratio being 882 women per 1000 men)

Economy
Agriculture is the main occupation of the people. Most of the people are engaged in the village as farm workers. Many families here live in poverty while others are well to do. Some are farm workers, while others work as labourers in neighbouring cities. Modern agriculture techniques are being followed by the farmers which add to income of the folk.

Employment
There are much fewer opportunities of employment in industries around the village. People need to go to nearby city like Agra, Mathura, Bharatpur for daily wages. Many people are engaged in government jobs. There is the special attraction of youth of village to join armed forces and police.

Agriculture
The village's main occupation is agriculture. Farmers mainly produce wheat, mustard (or rapeseed), potato and other vegetables. Production of paddy has been introduced recently with the introduction of deep bore-wells. Sub-soil water is the main source of irrigation. The village now has some 40 tractors for farm works. Plot sizes have declined with the growth of population.

Festivals and carnivals
Hindu festivals of Diwali, Maha Shivaratri, Holi, Raksha Bandhan (lord of Shri Krishna Janmashtmi) and Navratri are main festivals among others which are celebrated in the village

Tourism

Nearby visitor attractions 
 Fatehpur Sikri,  approx 22 km by road
 Taj Mahal, 35 km by road and rail
 Agra Fort, 33 km by road and rail
 Keoladeo National Park (bird sanctuary), Bharatpur, Rajasthan, 30 km by road and rail
 Mathura, 32 km by road and rail
 Vrindavan, 36 km by road and rail
 Govardhan, 52 km by road
 Gokul, Baldev or Dauji and other places of religious importance are nearby

Education
Chhai Pokhar has a government primary school and a junior high school apart from private schools, e.g. Maa Sharada public school and Bhagwan Kalki public school. There is no high school or pre-college education available in the village. Higher education facility is available in nearby towns and cities. Students focused on higher education tend to go outside.

Villages in Agra district